Robert James Aubrey (14 November 1921 – 26 December 2015) was an Australian rules footballer who played with St Kilda in the Victorian Football League (VFL).

Personal life
Aubrey served as a leading aircraftman in the Royal Australian Air Force during the Second World War.

Notes

External links 

Bob Aubrey's playing statistics from The VFA Project

1921 births
2015 deaths
Prahran Football Club players
St Kilda Football Club players
Royal Australian Air Force personnel of World War II
Royal Australian Air Force airmen
Australian rules footballers from Bendigo